Papilio woodfordi, the Woodford's swallowtail, is a swallowtail butterfly of the Papilioninae subfamily. It is found on various islands in the Pacific Ocean (see Subspecies section).

The larvae feed on Citrus species.

Subspecies
Papilio woodfordi woodfordi (Bougainville, Shortland Islands)
Papilio woodfordi choiseuli Rothschild (Choiseul)
Papilio woodfordi laarchus Godman & Salvin, 1888 (New Georgia Group)
Papilio woodfordi ariel Grose-Smith, 1889 (Santa Isabel)

Taxonomy
Papilio woodfordi is a member of the aegeus species group. The clade members are:
Papilio aegeus Donovan, 1805 
Papilio bridgei Mathew, 1886
 ? Papilio erskinei Mathew, 1886
Papilio gambrisius Cramer, [1777]
Papilio inopinatus Butler, 1883
Papilio ptolychus Godman & Salvin, 1888
Papilio tydeus C. & R. Felder, 1860
Papilio weymeri Niepelt, 1914
Papilio woodfordi Godman & Salvin, 1888

External links

Butterfly Corner Images from Naturhistorisches Museum Wien

woodfordi
Taxa named by Frederick DuCane Godman
Taxa named by Osbert Salvin
Butterflies described in 1888